The 2022 Svijany Open was a professional tennis tournament played on clay courts. It was the 9th edition of the tournament which was part of the 2022 ATP Challenger Tour. It took place in Liberec, Czech Republic between 1 and 7 August 2022.

Singles main-draw entrants

Seeds

 1 Rankings are as of 25 July 2022.

Other entrants
The following players received wildcards into the singles main draw:
  Andrew Paulson
  Daniel Siniakov
  Michael Vrbenský

The following player received entry into the singles main draw using a protected ranking:
  Pedro Sousa

The following player received entry into the singles main draw as an alternate:
  Otto Virtanen

The following players received entry from the qualifying draw:
  Giovanni Mpetshi Perricard
  Sumit Nagal
  Lukas Neumayer
  Petr Nouza
  Yshai Oliel
  Denis Yevseyev

The following player received entry as a lucky loser:
  Vitaliy Sachko

Champions

Singles

  Jiří Lehečka def.  Nicolás Álvarez Varona 6–4, 6–4.

Doubles

  Neil Oberleitner /  Philipp Oswald def.  Roman Jebavý /  Adam Pavlásek 7–6(7–5), 6–2.

References

2022 ATP Challenger Tour
2022
Sport in Liberec
2022 in Czech sport
August 2022 sports events in the Czech Republic